La dama de Chez Maxim's is a 1923 Italian silent comedy film directed by Amleto Palermi and starring Carmen Boni, Alfredo Martinelli and Pina Menichelli. It is an adaptation of the 1899 play La Dame de chez Maxim by Georges Feydeau.

Cast
 Carmen Boni
 Alfredo Martinelli
 Pina Menichelli
 Ugo Gracci
 Marcel Lévesque
 Arrigo Marchio

See also
 Maxim's

External links

1923 films
Italian comedy films
1920s Italian-language films
Italian films based on plays
Films based on works by Georges Feydeau
Films directed by Amleto Palermi
1923 comedy films
Italian silent feature films
Italian black-and-white films
Silent comedy films
1920s Italian films